Feliks Karol Koneczny (1 November 1862 – 10 February 1949) was a Polish historian, theatrical critic, librarian, journalist and social philosopher. He founded the original system of the comparative science of civilizations.

Biography 
Koneczny was born in Kraków on 1 November 1862,m. His father was of Moravian origin. Koneczny's mother abandoned him at a young age while his father studied, although he  had to work at a train station due to being expelled from the Jagiellonian University for partaking in the Kraków uprising.

Koneczny graduated from the Faculty of Philosophy at the Jagiellonian University in Kraków and began work at the Jagiellonian Library. After Poland regained its independence, he became an assistant professor in 1919. In June 1920, after he had qualified and received the degree of doctor habilitatus, he became a professor at Stefan Batory University in Wilno. After retiring in 1929, he moved back to Kraków.

Works 

His interests ranged from purely historical research to the philosophy of history, religion and philosophy. His pioneering works deal with the history of Russia. Koneczny authored extensive monographs on Byzantine and Jewish civilizations, which he considered to be less developed than the Latin civilization of Catholic western Europe. In 1948, after sixty years of research work, Koneczny calculated that his written scholarly output encompassed 26 volumes, each of them being 300 to 400 pages long, not to mention more than 300 articles, brochures and reprints. His theory of civilizations might have inspired those of Anton Hilckman, Samuel P. Huntington and others.

Types of civilizations 
Feliks Koneczny divided civilizations into about twenty types, of which seven types still exist. Four are ancient: "Brahmin," "Jewish," "Chinese," and "Turanian". Three are medieval: "Latin," "Byzantine," and "Arab." The differences between civilizations are based on their attitude to law and ethics.

For example, Koneczny claimed that in the Latin civilization, ethics is the source of law. If some laws are not ethical, then they are changed. Government is judged on the basis of its adherence to ethics. The law is of dual nature, divided into public and private spheres. Religion is autonomous, independent and separated from the state. Individuality, self-rule and decentralization are highly valued. Knowledge is empirical.

In the Byzantine civilization, organized religion is dependent on the state. In this type of civilization all means are justified to achieve political goals. Politicians follow ethics in private life, but in public they are judged by their skills, not by ethics. The legal government has absolute authority and its orders are not doubted. Germany under Bismarck was an example of that type of civilization.

In the Turanian civilization, the government is the source of law and ethics and stands above the law and ethics. The ruler cannot be doubted. Koneczny considered Russia under the Tsars as an example of this type of civilization.

The Jewish civilization considers the law most important. The law is the source of ethics. The law cannot be changed. However, the same law can be differently interpreted, which leads to ethical relativism. Similarly to the Brahmin or Hindu civilization, it is sacral, with religion playing a central role. According to Koneczny, one of the elements of Jewish civilization is a belief in the superior role of one nation or race. Communist states, despite their atheism, are also products of Jewish civilization.

Koneczny claimed that civilizations cannot mix, and any "synthesis" of several civilizations leads to the victory of one over the other, lower moral standards, or to a state of "un-civilization."

Koneczny did not tie civilizational type to any particular race or nation. Hence, Poles could represent the Turanian type of civilization (as, according to Koneczny, did Józef Piłsudski's Poland) and Germans could represent the Jewish type. In his publication Hitleryzm zażydzony ('The Judaized Hitlerism') Koneczny claimed that Adolf Hitler was an example of the Jewish civilization type. On the other hand, an ethnic Jew could represent the Latin type of civilization.

Koneczny considered racism something alien to Latin civilization, which he considered the highest type.

According to Koneczny, Europe in his time was a battlefield between three types of civilization: Latin, Turan and Jewish. He argued that the Byzantine type of civilization had already lost the battle and was in deep crisis.

Works 
Most in Polish; seven books are available in English translation.

 Dzieje Rosyi. Tom I. (do roku 1449), Spółka Wydawnicza Warszawska, Warsaw 1917 (in Polish)
Polskie Logos a Ethos, t. I–II, Księgarnia sw. Wojciecha, Poznań 1921.
O wielości cywilizacyj, Gebethner & Wolff, Kraków 1935. English translation (abridged) On the Plurality of Civilisations, Polonica Publications, London 1962, Antyk, Komorów, 2012  .
English Translation: Web page, Word (1.2MB)
Święci w dziejach narodu polskiego / Saints in the history of the Polish nation, t. 1–2, Tow. Sw. Michała Archanioła, Miejsce Piastowe 1937–1939.
Rozwój moralności Tow. Wiedzy Chrześć., Lublin 1938. English translation "The Development of Morality", Antyk, Komorów, 2016.
Cywilizacja bizantyjska, Towarzystwo im. Romana Dmowskiego, London 1973. English translation "The Byzantine Civilization", Antyk, Komorów, 2014.
Cywilizacja żydowska, Towarzystwo im. Romana Dmowskiego, London 1974. English translation "The Jewish Civilization", Antyk, Komorów, 2012.
O ład w historii, Towarzystwo im. Romana Dmowskiego, London 1977. English translation "On order in History" Antyk, Komorów, 2014.
 Państwo w cywilizacji łacińskiej. Zasady prawa w cywilizacji łacińskiej / State in Latin civilisation. Rules of law in Latin civilisation, Towarzystwo im. Romana Dmowskiego, London 1981 (in Polish). English translation "The Latin Civilization" Antyk, Komorów,2016. 
Prawa dziejowe (oraz dodatek) Bizantynizm niemiecki / History laws (and an addendum) German byzantinism, Towarzystwo im. Romana Dmowskiego, London 1982.English translation "The Laws of History" Antyk, Komorów, 2013.
Dzieje Rosji / History of Russia. Tom III. Schyłek Iwana III / Downfall of Ivan III of Russia. 1492–1505, Towarzystwo im. Romana Dmowskiego, London 1984.
 Zionism and the Polish cause (in Polish)

See also 

 Stanisław Brzozowski
 Aleksandr Dugin
 Ibn Khaldun
 Oswald Spengler
 Jan Stachniuk
 Arnold J. Toynbee

References

External links
Slavism and Sciences and Humanities in the 19th and 20th Centuries

Further reading
 P. Biliński Feliks Koneczny (1862–1949). Życie i działalność. Ad astra, Warsaw 2001.

1862 births
1949 deaths
Jagiellonian University alumni
Writers from Kraków
Polish Roman Catholics
Social philosophers
Philosophers of culture
Philosophers of history
Academic staff of Vilnius University
Burials at Salwator Cemetery
20th-century Polish historians
20th-century Polish philosophers
Polish male non-fiction writers
Polish nationalists
Polish conservatives
Polish anti-communists
Polish political writers
Polish sociologists
Polish social scientists
19th-century Polish historians